Ornithogalum libanoticum, or Lebanon ornithogalum, is a species of Ornithogalum in the subfamily Scilloideae of family Asparagaceae.

Description 
The white flowers are born in April and May on simple racemes in an inflorescence of 10 to 20 flowers. It has linear, lanceolate, obtuse and subacute clear white tepals. The backside of the tepals is marked by a single green or brown band. The fruit is a six-side oval capsule.

Distribution and habitat 
The plant is endemic to Lebanon and Syria, It favors rocky terrain.

References 

Flora of Lebanon
libanoticum
Taxa named by Pierre Edmond Boissier